Cyclopsitta is a genus of parrot in the family Psittaculidae. Its four species are native to the Australian continent, primarily the island of New Guinea.

The genus name Cyclopsitta is a combination of the Greek name of the mythical Cyclops (a race of one-eyed Sicilian giants, whose name is a combination of the Greek word kuklos, meaning "circle" and ōps, meaning "eye"), and the modern Latin psitta, meaning "parrot".

References

 
Psittacidae
Bird genera
Taxonomy articles created by Polbot
Taxa named by Ludwig Reichenbach